Goventment Science College may refer to:
 Government Science College, Bangalore, India
 Government Science College, Dhaka, Bangladesh

See also 
 Government College of Science, Lahore, Pakistan